Ferenc Török (born Budapest, 23 April 1971) is a Hungarian film director. He has received Béla Balázs Award, a state recognition for outstanding achievement in filmmaking. Török is a member of the European Film Academy.

Education
In 1995, he was admitted to the Academy of Drama and Film in Budapest. 
His final graduation project film, Moscow Square,
won the "Best First Film" award at the Hungarian Film Festival in 2000.

Filmography

Director (21 credits) 
 Tranzit (1999)
 Valaki kopog (2000)
 Moscow Square (2001)
 A Bus Came... (2003)
 Eastern Sugar (2004)
 Európából Európába (2004)
 Von den Sockeln (2004)
 A Pál utcai fiúk (2005)
 A Day Off (2005)
 Csodálatos vadállatok (2005)
 Overnight (2007)
 HVG30 (2009)
 Koccanás (2009)
 Logbook '89–'09 (2009)
 Apacsok (2010)
 Istanbul (Isztambul) (2011)
 East Side Stories (2012)
 Magyarország 2011 (2011)
 Hegyek és tengerek köztt: Samira (2013)
 Brigád (2013)
 Senki szigete (2014)
 1945 (2016)

Writer (15 credits) 
 Tranzit (1999)
 Valaki kopog (2000)
 Moscow Square (2001)
 A Bus Came... (2003)
 Eastern Sugar (2004)
 A Day Off (2005)
 Csodálatos vadállatok (2005)
 Overnight (2007)
 HVG30 (2009)
 Logbook '89-09''' (2009)
 Isztambul (2011)
 East Side Stories (2012)
 Magyarország 2011 (2012)
 Hegyek és tengerek köztt: Samira (2013)
 Brigád (2013)

 Second Unit Director/Assistant Director (1 credit) 
 Valaki kopog'' (2009)

References

External links
 

1971 births
Hungarian film directors
Hungarian screenwriters
Male screenwriters
Hungarian male writers
Writers from Budapest
Living people